Scoring over 10,000 runs across a playing career in any format of cricket is considered a significant achievement. In the chase for achieving top scores, West Indian Garfield Sobers retired as the most prolific run scorer in Test cricket, with a total of 8,032 runs in 1974. The record stood for nine years, until it was broken by England's Geoffrey Boycott in the 1982 series against India. Boycott remained the top scorer in the format until Indian batsman Sunil Gavaskar surpassed his tally two years later in 1983. In March 1987, Gavaskar became the first player to cross 10,000 run mark in Tests during a match against Pakistan. , fourteen players—from seven teams that are Full Members of the International Cricket Council (ICC)—have scored 10,000 runs in Tests. Out of these, three are from Australia and India, while two are from England, Sri Lanka and the West Indies. One player each from Pakistan and South Africa form the rest. No player from Bangladesh, New Zealand, Afghanistan, Ireland or Zimbabwe has passed the 10,000 run mark in Tests yet.

In terms of innings, West Indian Brian Lara, Sachin Tendulkar and Kumar Sangakkara are the fastest (195) to reach the 10,000 run mark, while Australia's Steve Waugh is the slowest to achieve the feat (244). Tendulkar holds multiple records—most appearances (200 matches), most runs (15,921) and highest number of both centuries (51) and half-centuries (68). England's Joe Root is the fastest in terms of time span, taking 9 years and 174 days, while West Indian Shivnarine Chanderpaul's time span of 18 years and 37 days is the slowest among all. Joe Root and Alastair Cook share the record for the youngest player to score 10,000 runs, both reaching this milestone at the age of 31 years and 157 days.

Key
 First – denotes the year of debut
 Last – denotes the year of the latest match
 Mat. – denotes the number of matches played
 Inn. – denotes the number of innings batted
 Date – denotes the date on which the player reached the 10,000 run mark
 ^ – denotes that the player was at some time the leading run scorer in Tests
  – denotes that the player is active in Tests

Players with 10,000 or more Test runs

By country

See also 
 List of Test cricket records
 List of players who have scored 10,000 or more runs in One Day International cricket

Notes

References

External links 

Test cricket records
Cricket-related lists